The 21st Question is a British game show that aired on ITV from 4 to 15 August 2014 and was hosted by Gethin Jones.

Format
There are 11 contestants in each game. Each contestant is on the show for a full week, unless they make it to Q21, meaning that if they are out, they have a chance to play again.

Question 1
Question 1 is about playing for position in Questions 2–20. There is a question with ten potential answers. Five of these are correct. Each contestant taps their answers in. The fastest person to get all five answers gets to choose their position first (out of spots 1–10 or the Power Spot), with the second person choosing second, and so on until the slowest person is left with the last remaining place.

Questions 2–20
The person in the Power Spot battles each of the other contestants individually (starting with the person on Spot 1 onwards) with multiple-choice questions based on a category chosen by the person on the Power Spot. If both players get the question correct, or if both get it wrong, another question is asked until both have answered three questions with one another. If this happens on the third question in a battle, the person who is not on the Power Spot leaves the game and is out. If the person on the Power Spot gets it wrong but the other gets it right, the other takes the place of the Power Spot player and the person who is on the Power Spot is out. If the Power Spot player is right but the other player is wrong, the other player is out.

Due to there being just 21 questions in the game, often the players in spots 8, 9 and 10 don't participate in a game, meaning that there are regular updates on the probability of them playing – if the probability of one of them reaches 0, they leave the game as there is no chance of them winning.

Every correct answer adds to the prize fund, and contestants are regularly given the opportunity to 'Double Up' – this means that the Question is made harder but is worth twice the money.

Question 21
The player on the Power Spot by the end on Q20 gets to play the 21st Question. A final question is a 'Top 10' list. The player must give six answers from the list, with just one wrong answer resulting in them being out.

If the player is able to get three answers correct, they will win half the total prize fund accumulated in the previous questions. If the player chooses to gamble and gives another two more correct answers, they win the total prize fund. If they gamble once more and give one more correct answer, they will win double the prize fund.

If at any time a user gives an answer that is not in the top 10 they win nothing.

References

External links

2014 British television series debuts
2014 British television series endings
2010s British game shows
English-language television shows
ITV game shows
Television series by Universal Television